The Sala Parés is the oldest art gallery in Barcelona, Spain. Initially an art store, established in 1840 by Joan Parés, it slowly evolved into a gallery and formally became one in 1877.

History
Founded by the original store owner's son, an art collector, it became the primary artistic showcase for Barcelona during the "" (Gold Rush), a period of rapid economic growth for the Catalan bourgeoisie. The artists who got their start there at that time include  Modest Urgell, Romà Ribera, Josep and Francesc Masriera and Simó Gómez. 

In the early 1890s, it became the home base for a new generation of Modernist painters such as Santiago Rusiñol and Ramon Casas. It also became the exhibit hall of choice for the Cercle Artístic de Sant Lluc.

Parés himself showed no particular inclination for any artistic style and was quite eclectic in his choice of works for display. This eventually led to a decline in favor of other galleries with more specific orientations, such as the Faianç Català, the Galeries Laietanes (both devoted to Noucentisme) and the Galeries Dalmau (Avant-garde).

In 1925, it was acquired by the art dealer, youngest son of the poet  Joan Maragall. Auctions were also established and it became a major supplier of older paintings for museums. After World War II, although the gallery maintained its connections to the avant-garde, it also began to focus more on Postimpressionism and other relatively conservative styles.

A branch in Madrid, known as the "Swan Gallery" is operated by Maragall's son. In 2013, it was announced that a showroom would be opened in Shanghai, China.

References

Further reading 
 Joan-Antoni Maragall, Història de la Sala Parés, Selecta, 1975

External links

Sala Parés website

1877 establishments in Spain
Art galleries established in 1877
Art museums and galleries in Spain
Contemporary art galleries in Spain
Buildings and structures in Barcelona
Culture in Barcelona
Tourist attractions in Barcelona